The Annual Review of Animal Biosciences is a peer-reviewed scientific journal published by Annual Reviews. It releases an annual volume of review articles relevant to the fields of zoology, veterinary medicine, animal husbandry, and conservation biology. It has been in publication since 2013. The co-editors are Harris A. Lewin and R. Michael Roberts. As of 2022, Journal Citation Reports lists the journal's impact factor as 13.341.

History
The Annual Review of Animal Biosciences was first published in 2013, with Harris A. Lewin and R. Michael Roberts as the founding co-editors. Though it was initially published in print, as of 2021 it is only published electronically.

Scope and indexing
The Annual Review of Animal Biosciences defines its scope as covering significant developments relevant to biotechnology, genomics, genetics, veterinary medicine, animal breeding, and conservation biology. The intended audience for the journal is scientists and veterinarians involved with wild and domestic animals. As of 2022, Journal Citation Reports lists the journal's impact factor as 13.341, ranking it  
first of 176 titles in "Zoology", 
first of 62 journal titles in the category "Agriculture, Dairy, and Animal Sciences", 
first of 144 titles in "Veterinary Science", and 
seventh of 158 titles in "Biotechnology and Applied Microbiology". It is abstracted and indexed in Scopus, Science Citation Index Expanded, MEDLINE, and Embase, among others.

References 

 

Animal Biosciences
Annual journals
Publications established in 2013
English-language journals
Animal science journals